Lars Gustav Gabriel Hollmer (21 July 1948 – 25 December 2008) was a Swedish accordionist, keyboardist and composer, whose work drew on music ranging from Nordic folk tunes to progressive rock. He has been a member and/or founder of over half a dozen groups, most of whose work has been recorded at The Chickenhouse, his well outfitted home studio in his hometown of Uppsala. His work with the band Samla Mammas Manna, in the late 1960s and early 1970s and up to 2002, when the re-formed group played at the two-day ProgDay festival in North Carolina, was and is considered progressive rock. However, he is most centrally an empathetic and generous collaborator: whether as a member of Accordion Tribe, while working with the experimental guitarist Fred Frith, or while spending several months with Japanese jazz players, he seems to find a style that brings his partners to the fore while remaining identifiably himself. Though his work is little known in the United States, he won a Swedish Grammis award in 1999 for his record Andetag. He has also composed extensively for Swedish film, as well as for theatre and dance productions.   Consistent elements of his music throughout his career included use of irregular time signatures (often changing several times within a piece), a daring sense of improvisation (particularly vocal improvisation that utilized nonsense syllables), and used complex polyrhythms.

Hollmer died in December 2008 of cancer, aged 60. He is buried in Berthåga Cemetery in Uppsala.

Discography

With Samla Mammas Manna
Samla Mammas Manna 1971
Måltid 1973
Klossa Knapitatet 1974
Snorungarnas Symfoni 1976
Kaka 1999
Dear mamma 2002

With Zamla Mammaz Manna
Schlagerns Mystik / För Äldre Nybegynnare  (The Mystery of Popular Music / For Older Beginners) 1977
Familjesprickor (Family Cracks) 1980

With von Zamla
Zamlaranamma 1982
 "1983" (Live) 1983
No Make Up 1984

With Ramlösa Kvällar
 Ramlösa Kvällar (Nights Without Frames) 1977

With Fem Söker En Skatt
Fem Söker En Skatt 1995

With Looping Home Orchestra
Vendeltid 1987
Lars Hollmer. Looping Home Orchestra Live 92–93 (DOOR FLOOR SOMETHING WINDOW) 1994

With Accordion Tribe
Accordion Tribe (live, 1998)
Sea of Reeds (2002)
Lunghorn Twist (2006)

With Japanese jazz players
 SOLA 2000

With Fanfare Pourpour
 Karusell musik 2007

With Lindsay Cooper, Fred Frith and Gianni Gebbia
Angels on the Edge of Time (2015, CD, I Dischi di Angelica, Italy) – recorded at the 1992 Angelica Festival

Solo albums
XII Sibiriska Cyklar 1981
Vill Du Höra Mer 1982
Från Natt Idag 1983
Joggingcharleston (Single, 1984)
Tonöga 1985
The Siberian Circus 1993
Vandelmässa 1995
Andetag 1998
Utsikter 2000
Autokomp A(nd) More 2001
Viandra 2007
Med mjölad hand (skisser) 2012

References

External links

Krax
The Story So Far
Boeves Psalm recorded by Guy Klucevsek
Lars Hollmer Tribute on the Accordion Noir Radio show.

1948 births
2008 deaths
Swedish composers
Swedish male composers
Swedish accordionists
Swedish keyboardists
Deaths from cancer in Sweden
20th-century accordionists
20th-century Swedish male musicians
20th-century Swedish musicians